Amanda Jay Mortimer Burden ( Mortimer; January 18, 1944) is a principal at Bloomberg Associates, an international consulting service founded by Michael Bloomberg as a philanthropic venture to help city governments improve the quality of life of their citizens. She was the director of the New York City Department of City Planning and chair of the City Planning Commission under Mayor Bloomberg from 2002 to 2013.

She was a proponent of revitalizing Lower Manhattan, improving public access to the Brooklyn waterfronts, improving commuter rail into the city, and reconsidering rezoning plans. Burden was an important supporter and active contributor to the success of the project for public redevelopment of the High Line. She had a reputation of holding developers to stricter design standards than previous planning directors. As stated in a 2007 profile of Burden in The New York Times: "Whether walking up and down 368 blocks in Jamaica, Queens, to see which streets can accommodate 12-story buildings, or grabbing a tape measure from her desk to set the dimensions of seating in public plazas across the city, Ms. Burden is leaving an indelible legacy of how all five boroughs will look and feel for decades to come."

Burden previously worked for the New York State Urban Development Corporation. She worked on Battery Park City from 1983 to 1990. She is also a member of the International Best Dressed List since 1996.

Early life
Burden is the daughter of socialite Babe Paley (1915–1978) and her first husband, Stanley Grafton Mortimer Jr. (1913–1999), an heir to the Standard Oil fortune. She is a descendant of the first chief justice of the U.S. Supreme Court, John Jay, and a granddaughter of Dr. Harvey Cushing, the "Father of American Neurosurgery" and Pulitzer Prize winning author. She has a brother, Stanley Grafton Mortimer III; five half-siblings, William Cushing Paley, Kate Cushing Paley, Averell Mortimer, Jay Mortimer, and David Mortimer; and two step-siblings, Hilary Paley Califano and Jeffrey Paley. In 1947, her mother married William S. Paley, the son of a successful immigrant cigar entrepreneur who built a family acquisition into CBS. Her stepmother, Kathleen Harriman Mortimer (1917–2011), was a daughter of railroad heir and United States ambassador W. Averell Harriman.

She graduated from the Westover School in Middlebury, Connecticut and attended Wellesley College until her marriage in 1964. She graduated from Sarah Lawrence College in 1976, with a concentration in environmental science. She later earned a Master of Urban Planning from Columbia University, writing an award-winning thesis about solid-waste management.

Career
Burden worked with the architecture firm Gruzen & Partners and one of her mentors was William H. Whyte, the urbanologist, with whom she worked on his Project for Public Spaces.

From 1983 until 1990, Burden was Vice President for Planning and Design of the Battery Park City Authority. She was responsible for the development and implementation of design guidelines for the  site as well as for overseeing the design of all open spaces and parkland, including the waterfront esplanade. In an interview for New York magazine, she cited her stepfather's influence on her design sensibilities, noting the Canadian black granite she chose for the esplanade was the same stone he selected in 1964 for "Black Rock", the CBS headquarters. Among her other New York projects are the Midtown Community Court and the Red Hook Community Justice Center, which provides integrated legal, economic and social services.

Starting in 1990, Burden served on the New York City Planning Commission, when she was appointed by New York City Council president Andrew Stein. She served as Commissioner from 2002 to 2013 under Mayor Bloomberg, and since then has become a Principal at Bloomberg Associates.

Burden also worked as a public school teaching aide in Harlem in the 1960s.

New York City Planning Commission
Burden served as Chairperson of the New York City Planning Commission and Director of the Department of City Planning from 2002 to 2013 under Mayor Michael Bloomberg. She had served on the commission since her appointment by New York City Council president Andrew Stein in 1990. During her tenure, the department rezoned almost 40% of the city. The department helped to create the East River Esplanade, transform the High Line into High Line Park, and develop the Brooklyn Waterfront and Hudson Yards. The Bloomberg administration also launched a "comprehensive waterfront plan known as Vision 2020", which would increase access to the water for kayakers and canoeists and address climate change. Burden said the goal of the initiative was for the water to become the "sixth borough" of the city. "The water should become a part of our everyday lives", she declared.

In her term, Burden sought to combine the large transformative change of Robert Moses with a neighborhood-sensitive ethic inspired by Jane Jacobs, writing in 2006, "Big projects are a necessary part of the diversity, competition and growth that both Jacobs and Moses fought for. But today's big projects must have a human scale; must be designed, from idea to construction, to fit into the city. Projects may fail to live up to Jane Jacob's standards, but they are still judged by her rules."

During her tenure, the commission and the Bloomberg administration as a whole were widely seen to have an "overall friendliness to development". Burden herself characterized the administration as "unabashedly pro-development", and said, "What I have tried to do, and think I have done, is create value for these developers, every single day of my term." The administration believed it could address issues of rising living costs in the city with new development, strategically increased density, and an increase in housing supply, while attracting a wealthier tax base through gentrification.

When asked how his administration would address the city's income gap, Bloomberg argued against the idea an income gap is negative, saying "They [rich people] are the ones that pay a lot of the taxes. They're the ones that spend a lot of money in the stores and restaurants and create a big chunk of our economy ... If we could get every billionaire around the world to move here it would be a godsend that would create a much bigger income gap." Describing the administration's approach to development, Burden said, "Improvement of neighborhoods — some people call it gentrification — provides more jobs, provides housing, much of it affordable, and private investment, which is tax revenue for the city."

Burden also focused on managing the aesthetics of new development in a way that maintains the character of a neighborhood. "We have tried to diagnose the DNA of each neighborhood", she said. "I have spent a lot of time in the streets, talking to communities." She emphasized public features like "open space, continuous shop fronts, and the inclusion of trees and other elements that foster lively street life." Because of Burden's contextual zoning, which required new development to fit in with the height and style of nearby structures, some developers were forced to restrain and redesign proposals, like 53W53, which was reduced by 200 feet.

The Regional Plan Association argued Burden's control over the aesthetics of development led to "profoundly conservative building" and a "local zeitgeist [that] has switched from big and bold to keeping everything small, nondescript and similar to everything else in the neighborhood." According to Eliot Brown in The New York Observer, "Ms. Burden is an increasingly powerful and apparently emboldened force in the Bloomberg administration—one whose often forceful views are imprinted and emblazoned on nearly every major skyscraper, mall, public plaza and large development that rises in city limits."

By the end of Burden's (and Bloomberg's) term, homelessness rates had more than doubled since the year 2000. Housing prices had appreciated by 98%, and the median rent in New York City had increased by $1,380 per year, while the median income of renter households decreased by $3,344. The Furman Center found that "new construction primarily targets a luxury market", with "the majority of newly constructed units rented at levels well beyond the means of the average renter household in New York City." Despite a focus on increased development and intent to respect the wishes and diversity of neighborhoods, the increase in housing supply, density and major zoning changes had not translated into affordable rents or homes. Burden herself acknowledged the failure to address livability when speaking in 2013 at a CityLab panel on urban expansion:

Honors
Burden, then 22, was named to the Best Dressed List of the New York Couture Group in 1966, replacing Jacqueline Kennedy Onassis, who had graduated to the Best Dressed List's Hall of Fame.

In 2005, Pratt Institute awarded Ms. Burden an Honorary Doctorate in Public Administration and the New York Chapter of the American Institute of Architects presented her with its 2005 Center for Architecture Award. Ms. Burden's dedication to design excellence was recognized by the Smithsonian Cooper-Hewitt, National Design Museum, which presented her with its 2004 Design Patron Award. In 2008, Ms. Burden was inducted into the membership of the American Institute of Certified Planners (AICP) College of Fellows, and was named the 5th most powerful person in New York real estate by The New York Observer.
In 2009, Burden received ULI's J.C. Nichols Prize for Visionaries in Urban Development. This prize is the Institute's highest honor and comes with a $100,000 award. Burden announced that she will donate the J.C. Nichols prize money to ULI to create a yearly award honoring transformative and exciting public spaces around the world. In 2011, Burden received the American Architectural Foundation Keystone Award, which recognizes an individual or organization from outside the architectural discipline for exemplary leadership in design that improves lives and transforms communities. The Award recognizes Commissioner Burden's legacy as a champion of good design and her continuous efforts to use design excellence to increase quality of life in the five boroughs and promote New York City as a world-class city. Previous recipients include Rick Lowe, Charleston, South Carolina mayor Joseph P. Riley Jr., the U.S. General Services Administration (GSA), the Pritzker Family, Save America's Treasures, Museum of Modern Art (MOMA), and former Miami mayor Manuel A. Diaz.

Personal life
 
Burden has been married twice. Her first husband was Shirley Carter Burden Jr. (1941–1996), a multimillionaire descendant of Cornelius Vanderbilt and a great-nephew of the actor Douglas Fairbanks Sr. Their engagement was announced in September 1963 and at the time of their marriage on June 13, 1964, Carter Burden was a student at Columbia Law School. An owner of The Village Voice and New York magazine and later a New York City councilman, he worked as an aide to Sen. Robert Kennedy in the 1960s, sparking his wife's interest in social justice and inspiring her to pursue a teaching career. They had two children, Flobelle Fairbanks Burden (b. 1969) and S. Carter Burden III, before divorcing in 1972. Their son, S. Carter Burden III, is the founder of the managed web hosting provider Logicworks.

Her second husband was Steven J. Ross (1927–1992), the head of Warner Communications; they married in 1979 and divorced in 1981.

Vowing to never marry again, Burden maintained a "mostly platonic" relationship with television personality Charlie Rose from 1993 to about 2006.

References

Further reading
 "Amanda Burden — Engine Driving Mayor's Redevelopment Frenzy" by Max Driscoll, e-OCULUS, 04.15.08
 "Greetings from the Chair". NYC.gov

External links

 , filmed March 2014 at TED2014
 Amanda M. Burden Principal at Bloomberg Associates
 Bloomberg Associates, Team

New York City public officials
American urban planners
Women urban planners
Living people
1944 births
Mortimer family of New York
Sarah Lawrence College alumni
Wellesley College alumni
Columbia Graduate School of Architecture, Planning and Preservation alumni
Women government officials